Laurenz is both a given name and surname. Notable people with the name include:

 Laurenz Forer (1580–1659), Swiss Jesuit theologian and controversialist
 Laurenz Meyer (born 1948), German politician
 María Cristina Laurenz (born 1940), Argentine actress and singer
 Pedro Laurenz, Argentine tango music composer and director

See also
 Laurens (disambiguation)
 Lauren (disambiguation)
 Laurence (disambiguation)
 Laurenzo